Afsar Ali Ahmed is a Bangladesh Awami League politician and the former Member of Parliament of Rangpur-2.

Career
Ahmed was elected to parliament from Rangpur-2 as a Bangladesh Awami League candidate in 1973.

References

Awami League politicians
Living people
1st Jatiya Sangsad members
Year of birth missing (living people)